Cohanzick Zoo is a zoo in Bridgeton, New Jersey. Opened in 1934, it bills itself as New Jersey's first zoo. It houses over 100 animals, representing 45 species. Part of the city's Department of Recreation and Public Affairs, it is also supported by the Cumberland County government and donations. The zoo has an "adopt-an-animal" program to sponsor animal welfare.

References

External links
 

1934 establishments in New Jersey
Bridgeton, New Jersey
Zoos in New Jersey